NewsPlus is a news aggregator company based in Singapore and Hyderabad. It aggregates content from news sites, social media and blogs. The service can be accessed via web browser, or via mobile apps for iOS, Android.

Languages and Countries 
NewsPlus is localized into 10 languages.

NewsPlus brings news for India, United States, Philippines, Indonesia, Thailand, Malaysia, Pakistan, South Africa, and the local news for all major cities and towns.

History
NewsPlus app was originally launched under name of Veooz in August 2015  Since then product evolved significantly, with support for additional languages, and addition features like, magazines, direct sharing, social features.

References

Technology websites
News aggregators
Social media
Websites about digital media